James Grinwis is an American writer specialising in poetry, best known for the book Exhibit of Forking Paths.  He has also produced very short stories.

Early life
Grinwis graduated from Kent School in 1990.  He also graduated from the MFA Program for Poets & Writers.  He attended Hamilton College before graduate school at the University of Massachusetts-Amherst.

Awards
2010 National Poetry Series selection for Exhibit of Forking Paths

Works
City From Nome (National Poetry Review Press, 2011)
Exhibit of Forking Paths (Coffee House, 2011)

Reaction
Publishers Weekly praised Exhibit of Forking Paths for poems that are "fun, disjunctive, and seem improvisatory, while also sturdy".  James Heflin has described how Grinwis "piles images into mad quilts that instantly intrigue, and later tumble into intuitive meaning".

References

American male poets
Hamilton College (New York) alumni
Kent School alumni
Living people
University of Massachusetts Amherst MFA Program for Poets & Writers alumni
Year of birth missing (living people)